Amanda Fraser (born 10 November 1981 in Emerald, Queensland) is an Australian Paralympic athlete and swimmer. She has cerebral palsy and competes in the F37 category for the physically impaired. Competing in the 2000, 2004, and 2008 Summer Paralympics, she won two silver and two bronze medals, and in the 2006 World Championships, she won a gold and a silver medal. In the 2006 championships, she set a world record for discus in her classification, and was named 2006 Telstra Female AWD Athlete of the Year by Athletics Australia. Fraser now works as a personal trainer, working with people unfamiliar to a gym environment, especially women. She believes it is important for women to feel empowered and she aims to help them develop their mental and physical strength.

Career

Fraser was born with spastic hemiplegia, a form of cerebral palsy where one side of the body is affected. At the age of 12, she competed in the Queensland School Sports Athletics Championships and won three gold medals. She later moved on to swimming, and was selected to complete in the 2000 Summer Paralympics in Sydney, where she won bronze medals in the 4×100 m Freestyle 34-point relay and the S7 50 m Freestyle.

In 2001, she returned to athletics, and qualified for the 2004 Summer Paralympics with a world-record discus throw of 27.95 m at the national championships. At the Paralympics, she competed in the 100 m, shot-put, and discus events, winning a silver medal in the F37 discus classification, Australia's first medal in athletics at the event.

She competed in the 2006 International Paralympic Committee World Championships, where she broke the F37 discus world record with a throw of 29.93 metres, winning the gold medal at the event. Following this achievement, she was named the 2006 Telstra Female Athlete with a Disability of the Year by Athletics Australia.

At the 2008 Paralympic Games in Beijing, Fraser was initially awarded the bronze medal for the discus in the combined F37-38 event; however, she was given the silver medal when British athlete Rebecca Chin was disqualified on the basis that she was ineligible to compete in the cerebral palsy category. It was initially reported by ABC News that Fraser refused to shake Chin's hand after the event, however this was later corrected by The Australian when it was found that it was not Fraser who refused to shake hands, but British athlete Beverly Jones. She was an Australian Institute of Sport athletics scholarship holder from 2002 to 2008.

References

External links
 
 Amanda Fraser at Australian Athletics Historical Results (archive)
 
 

Female Paralympic swimmers of Australia
Paralympic athletes of Australia
Swimmers at the 2000 Summer Paralympics
Athletes (track and field) at the 2004 Summer Paralympics
Athletes (track and field) at the 2008 Summer Paralympics
Paralympic silver medalists for Australia
Paralympic bronze medalists for Australia
Cerebral Palsy category Paralympic competitors
Track and field athletes with cerebral palsy
Australian Institute of Sport Paralympic track and field athletes
Australian female discus throwers
Australian female shot putters
Australian female sprinters
Australian female freestyle swimmers
Sportswomen from Queensland
1981 births
Living people
Medalists at the 2000 Summer Paralympics
Medalists at the 2004 Summer Paralympics
Swimmers with cerebral palsy
S7-classified Paralympic swimmers
Medalists at the 2008 Summer Paralympics
Paralympic medalists in athletics (track and field)
Paralympic medalists in swimming
Medalists at the World Para Athletics Championships
Australian female medley swimmers